Chilkoot or The Chilkoot or variation may refer to:

 Chilkoot Barracks, an alternative name for Fort William H. Seward, Alaska, USA
 Chilkoot Inlet, terminus of the Chilkoot River, in Alaska
 Chilkoot Lake, in Haines Township, Alaska; source of the Chilkoot River
 Chilkoot Pass, on the Chilkoot Trail, crossing from Alaska, USA to BC, Canada, over the Coast Mountains
 Chilkoot Reservation, a U.S. Indian Reservation in Alaska, see List of Indian reservations in the United States
 Chilkoot River, a river in southeast Alaska
 Chilkoot Trail, a part of the Klondike Gold Rush Trail  between Dyea, Alaska, USA, and Bennett Lake, British Columbia, Canada
 Chilkoot tribe, a tribe of Tlingit found in Haines Township, Alaska, USA
 Port Chilkoot, a former municipality which was merged into Haines, Alaska

See also
 Chilkoot Trail and Dyea Site, a  National Historic Landmark  in Alaska
 Chilkat (disambiguation)